The Little 8 Conference was an IHSAA-sanctioned conference from 1955 to 1964. The league included schools from Hendricks, Morgan, and Putman counties. The beginning of the end was 1963, when New Winchester closed, followed by three more schools the next year, effectively folding the conference.

Members

References

Indiana high school athletic conferences
High school sports conferences and leagues in the United States